SWAT (special weapons & tactics for the prepared American) is a monthly magazine dedicated to firearms, law enforcement and other tactical-related activities in the United States with a special focus on SWAT police officers. 

The magazine primarily offers reviews on guns, ammunition, tactics, training, shooting gear; as well as self-defense and alerts on firearm rights. In addition to those departments, each issue contains featured articles and personality profiles of people in the tactical industry as well as press releases of new products.

SWAT staff writers include Massad Ayoob, Scott Reitz, Lewis Awerbuck, Leroy Thompson, Chuck Taylor, Claire Wolfe and Denny Hansen.

References

External links
 Official website

1981 establishments in Florida
Monthly magazines published in the United States
Firearms magazines
Magazines established in 1981
Magazines published in Florida